Pam Teeguarden (born April 17, 1951) is a former American professional tennis player in the 1970s and 1980s, ranked in the top 20 from 1970–1975. She won two Grand Slam Doubles Titles and was a quarter finalist in singles at the U.S. Open and The French Open.  Her father Jerry, a well known coach, helped Margaret Court win the coveted Grand Slam (all four Grand Slam titles in one year) in 1970 and Virginia Wade to her 1977 Wimbledon triumph. Teeguarden was voted the "Most Watchable Player" based on play and appearance by a group of Madison Avenue advertising executives or "Mad Men" while playing at the US Open. Teeguarden played in 19 consecutive US Opens, holding the record until Chris Evert played in 20. She wore the first all black outfit in the history of tennis in 1975 at The Bridgestone Doubles Championships in Tokyo, starting a trend that is still popular today. Teeguarden was the first woman tennis player signed by Nike. She played on the victorious Los Angeles Strings Team Tennis team in 1981 and won the Team Tennis Mixed Doubles Division with Tom Gullikson in 1977; they were also runners-up in the league that year.

Teeguarden won two grand slam titles:

US Open Mixed in 1974 (with Geoff Masters)
French Open in 1977 (with Regina Maršíková)

Among Teeguarden's doubles titles are the Canadian Open Doubles, the Swedish Open Doubles, the Austrian Open Doubles, the Argentinian Open Doubles, the Women's Games Doubles in Salt Lake City, and the Virginia Slims of Tucson Doubles. Pam was ranked second in the US twice behind Billie Jean King and Rosemary Casals and third on one other occasion with three different partners.  She and her partner, Mona Guerrant won the Virginia Slims of Houston defeating Francoise Durr and Betty Stove the same week that Billie Jean King played Bobby Riggs at the Houston Astrodome.

WTA Tour finals

Singles 2

Doubles 4 (3–1)

Mixed doubles 2 (1–1)

References

External links
 
 

American female tennis players
French Open champions
US Open (tennis) champions
1951 births
Living people
Grand Slam (tennis) champions in women's doubles
Grand Slam (tennis) champions in mixed doubles
Sportspeople from Jacksonville, Florida
Tennis people from Florida
21st-century American women